Marco Antonio Venegas Astudillo (born 1962) is a Swedish politician and former member of the Riksdag, the national legislature. A member of the Green Party, he represented Södermanland County between September 2014 and September 2018.

Venegas is the son of metalworker Mario Venegas and Yolanda Astudillo. He was educated in Santiago in Chile and at a Komvux in Nyköping. He has a degree in sociology from Stockholm University. He was a mental health worker in Nyköping (1987-1989); social secretary in Nyköping Municipality (1993-1995); aid worker in El Salvador (1996-1998); probation officer in Chile (1998-2000); and a social worker in Nyköping Municipality (2000-2014). He was a member of the municipal council in Nyköping Municipality between 1994 and 1995; between 2002 and 2006; and between 2010 and 2014. He was a member of the county council in Södermanland County from 2002 to 2010.

References

1962 births
Chilean emigrants to Sweden
Living people
Members of the Riksdag 2014–2018
Members of the Riksdag from the Green Party
Stockholm University alumni
Swedish politicians of Chilean descent